Autochloris magnifica is a moth of the subfamily Arctiinae. It was described by Rothschild in 1931. It is found in Bolivia and Peru.

Subspecies
Autochloris magnifica magnifica (Bolivia)
Autochloris magnifica reducta Rothschild, 1931 (Bolivia)
Autochloris magnifica rufipes Rothschild, 1931 (Peru)

References

Arctiinae
Moths described in 1931
Moths of South America